"Strobelite Honey"  is a 1991 single by hip-hop duo, Black Sheep.  The single was written by William McLean and Dres (rapper), and was the duo's third release from their A Wolf in Sheep's Clothing album.  "Stobelight Honey" was the duo's second entry on the US R&B chart, where it went peaked at #36 on the R&B sales chart and #80 on the Hot 100.  

The single did better on the US dance chart, where the remix by David Morales spent one week at number one. 

The song sampled a pair of records, both released in 1980: "I Like What You Do To Me" by Young & Company and "Take Your Time (Do it Right)" by the SOS Band.

See also
 List of number-one dance singles of 1992 (U.S.)
This single also sampled "The Glow of Love" by Change

References

1991 singles
American hip hop songs
1991 songs